Addison O'Dea is an American filmmaker and writer who specializes in anthropology. His work has been published and broadcast by National Geographic, Discovery and Ozy.

Family and education 
Hugh Addison White O'Dea was born on June 15, 1979, in New York Hospital to Hugh Patrick O'Dea Jr. (1938–2007) and Sara (née Greenway) O'Dea. He has two younger brothers, John Remsen Varick O'Dea and Patrick Gannon Greenway O'Dea. Based in New York City, the family traveled internationally extensively for both personal and professional reasons. O'Dea attended the Dwight School in Manhattan for international baccalaureate and holds a BSc from New York University.

O'Dea's father, Hugh Patrick O'Dea Jr., was murdered in Louisville, Kentucky in August 2007.

Work 
O'Dea, a former contributing editor at National Geographic Traveler, has written and directed a number of virtual reality documentary films focusing on subjects such as the origin of voodoo through West African Vodun in Togo and Benin; and ancient Quranic libraries in the Sahara.

, O'Dea was producing an action film set in the Sahara written and directed by Eugene Jarecki. Featuring a Tuareg character as the protagonist, the working title is "Tuareg Project". He is also the writer and producer of a documentary series called Beat Nation, currently in development with Ginedo Films, also produced by Nabil Elderkin and Mattia Bogianchino.

It was reported in 2021 that O'Dea is directing a feature film financed by Endeavor Content titled Unlikely Heroes.

Discovery TRVLR 
His largest project to date is writing and directing the thirty six-episode series Discovery TRVLR for Discovery, Inc. and Google. Filmed on all seven continents, the series centers around a "Guru, Renegade, Entertainer or Explorer" in each environment as they pull the curtain back on varying rituals, unique traditions and life-threatening quests that encompass their culture." At that time, Discovery TRVLR was Discovery's largest virtual reality project to date.

The series was designed by O'Dea to go to as remote locations as possible and focus on the universality of the people who live there. Rather than sending a message of 'we are all the same' or forcing Western ideals on the characters, the idea is to create an elegant juxtaposition at a hyperlocal level. "Defying convention" in Communist Vietnam is significantly different when contrasted alongside the same idea in Catholic Mexico.

From an interview with Addison in Filmmaker about the show:

Personal life 
In September 2019, O'Dea was reported to be engaged to be married to actress Minnie Driver.

Additional reading 
Essay by O'Dea on the principals of Vietnamese Buddhism in the afterlife in OZY
Essay by O'Dea on the religious cult of Santa Muerte in ''Monster Children
O'Dea being interviewed on Cheddar

References

External links 
Official website

Living people
1979 births
People from New York City
American explorers
American documentary filmmakers
American film directors
New York University alumni